Floortje Mackaij (born 18 October 1995) is a Dutch professional road racing cyclist, who currently rides for UCI Women's WorldTeam .

After switching from speed skating to road cycling she became the 2013 junior Dutch National time trial Champion and won a silver medal in the junior time trial at the 2013 European Road Championships. In the same year she represented her country at the UCI Road World Championships in the junior time trial and road race.

Personal life
Mackaij lives with her parents in Woerden and has one older brother. Her father, Ron Mackay, was also a professional cyclist. Mackaij graduated from the Minkema College, Woerden, in 2012 and went to the Johan Cruijff College afterwards.

Career

Early career
Mackaij started her career as a speed skater. When she was seven years old she became a member of a local speed skating club.  As a 'Junior C' and 'Junior B' she skated at national level and was part of the regional selection. Between 2011 and 2013 she participated every year at the Dutch Junior Championships. Her best result was 6th place as a Junior B in the 3000 metres at the Single Distance Championships in 2012. As part of her skating training she undertook cycling as part of cross-training in summer. She joined the local road cycling club and started riding official races a few years later when she was 14 years old. At the end of 2012 she joined the national selection and changed her main sport from speed skating to cycling.

2013

In one of the most prestigious stage races for junior riders, the Energiewacht Tour, Mackaij won one stage and the overall points classification, as she finished third in the general classification. In June she became Dutch National Time Trial Champion for juniors. A month later she won the silver medal in the time trial for junior riders at the 2013 European Road Championships and finished 21st in the road race. After training several times during the year with  she joined the team in August. Mackaij was selected to ride the time trial and road race at the 2013 UCI Road World Championships where she finished 8th and 13th respectively. Mackaij was awarded the title for sport talent of Woerden of the year 2013.

2014

Mackaij won the Parel van de Veluwe in June. She was selected to ride the road race at the 2014 European Road Championships where she finished seventh.

2015

On 22 March Mackaij won the non-UCI race Rabo Koepel Race in Lierop, after riding clear from a front group. Three days later she finished second behind Amy Pieters in Dwars door Vlaanderen. She finished the week with winning Gent–Wevelgem, her first elite UCI victory. She escaped in the last three kilometres from a front group three and was not pulled back by the others.

Career achievements

Major results

2013
 1st  Time trial, National Junior Road Championships
 2nd  Time trial, UEC European Junior Road Championships
 3rd Overall Energiewacht Tour (juniors)
1st  Points classification
1st Stage 3
 8th Time trial, UCI Junior Road World Championships
2014
 1st Parel van de Veluwe
 7th Road race, UEC European Under-23 Road Championships
 10th Overall Belgium Tour
2015
 1st Gent–Wevelgem
 1st Stage 3 Belgium Tour
 2nd Overall BeNe Ladies Tour
1st  Young rider classification
 2nd Dwars door Vlaanderen
 3rd 94.7 Cycle Challenge
 9th Overall Festival Luxembourgeois du cyclisme féminin Elsy Jacobs
1st  Points classification
1st  Mountains classification
1st  Young rider classification
1st Stage 3
 UEC European Under-23 Road Championships
10th Time trial
10th Road race
2016
 2nd Overall BeNe Ladies Tour
1st  Young rider classification
 2nd Omloop van Borsele
 3rd Omloop van de IJsseldelta
 3rd Women's Tour de Yorkshire
 4th Le Samyn des Dames
 4th Diamond Tour
 7th Ronde van Drenthe
 8th Gooik–Geraardsbergen–Gooik
 9th Overall Energiewacht Tour
1st  Young rider classification
 10th Overall The Women's Tour
1st  Young rider classification
 10th Ronde van Gelderland
2017
 1st  Team time trial, UCI Road World Championships
 3rd Road race, National Road Championships
 6th 7-Dorpenomloop Aalburg
 6th Omloop van de IJsseldelta
 9th Road race, UEC European Under-23 Road Championships
 10th Overall Healthy Ageing Tour
2018
 Ladies Tour of Norway
1st Team time trial
8th Overall Stage race
 2nd Le Samyn des Dames
 2nd Crescent Vårgårda TTT
 3rd Dwars door Vlaanderen
 6th Drentse Acht van Westerveld
 8th Overall Tour de Feminin-O cenu Českého Švýcarska
1st Points classification
1st Stages 1 & 4
 8th Gent–Wevelgem
 8th Veenendaal–Veenendaal Classic
 9th Overall Thüringen Rundfahrt der Frauen
 9th Ronde van Drenthe
2019
 1st  Team relay, UEC European Road Championships
 2nd Liège–Bastogne–Liège
 3rd Postnord UCI WWT Vårgårda West Sweden TTT
 5th Brabantse Pijl Dames Gooik
 6th Overall Ladies Tour of Norway
 7th Omloop van het Hageland
 7th Ronde van Drenthe
 9th Overall Madrid Challenge by la Vuelta
 10th Omloop Het Nieuwsblad
2020
 3rd Omloop Het Nieuwsblad
 3rd Brabantse Pijl Dames Gooik
2021
 1st  Overall Trophée des Grimpeuses
1st  Points classification
1st Stage 2
 2nd Overall Kreiz Breizh Elites Dames
 3rd  Team relay, UEC European Road Championships
 5th Ronde van Drenthe
 7th Dwars door Vlaanderen
 7th GP Oetingen
 8th Overall Challenge by La Vuelta
 10th Trofeo Alfredo Binda-Comune di Cittiglio
2022
 3rd Omloop van het Hageland
 3rd Drentse Acht van Westerveld
 6th Paris–Roubaix
2023
 1st Vuelta a la Comunitat Valenciana Feminas
 10th Strade Bianche

Championship results

Speed skating records

Notes

References

External links

 

1995 births
Living people
Dutch female cyclists
People from Woerden
Road racing cyclists
UCI Road World Championships cyclists for the Netherlands
Cyclists from Utrecht (province)
21st-century Dutch women